Dryophylax dixoni  is a species of snake in the family Colubridae. The species is endemic to Venezuela and Colombia.

References

Dryophylax
Snakes of South America
Reptiles of Venezuela
Reptiles of Colombia
Reptiles described in 2007